Neocaridina davidi is a freshwater shrimp originating from eastern China and northern Taiwan and introduced in the rest of Taiwan, Japan, and Hawaii, which is commonly kept in aquaria. The natural coloration of the shrimp is green-brown. There are a wide range of colors including red, yellow, orange, green, blue, violet, black, etc.; however, the red morph is more frequently sold. The density of coloration on adult shrimp, dependent on breeding, determines their sale price and "quality" (grading). This "quality" is purely aesthetic, as the size, behavior and other characteristics of the animal are more or less equal across varieties. N. davidi shrimp are omnivores that may live 1–2 years. These shrimps have previously been classified as Neocaridina heteropoda and Neocaridina denticulata sinensis, however are now known as Neocaridina davidi which is based on the oldest known published description of the species.

Housing 
N. davidi shrimp are easy to care for in the home freshwater aquarium and breed well. They will adapt to a wide range of water conditions and will thrive in the same conditions as many common aquarium fish. Neutral to slightly alkaline pH, with zero ammonia and nitrite as well as low nitrate, gives best results. A cooling system is recommended in warm climates. A planted tank is most comfortable for the shrimp and the plants provide cover for adults and young. Plants also provide more surface area to grow biofilm for shrimp to graze on.

The shrimp spends a great deal of its time sitting on aquatic plants, when available, and hiding in them for protection, especially after molting. They also eat the film of algae and microorganisms that form on plant leaves without harming the leaves in the process. Java moss and Java fern are both excellent plants for the shrimp tank, as they thrive in the same conditions as the N. davidi shrimp and provide both the physical benefits of the plants to the shrimp and aesthetics to human viewers. Young shrimp spend much of their early life hiding among plants and feeding on microorganisms and tank algae. Java moss is easy to find and cheap almost everywhere. It grows quickly and is a great place for young animals to hide.

N. davidi shrimp respond to the color of their background and substrate. If they are kept in a tank with a light-coloured substrate, they will become paler, or even transparent. On a darker substrate, they take on their full coloration. Colour intensity also depends on the types of food available (live foods and those high in protein and fats are more beneficial than flake foods), water pH, and temperature. Prepared foods specifically designed for shrimp are available at some suppliers.

Behavior 
The N. davidi shrimp is a non-aggressive shrimp. They are active throughout the day, and can be seen grazing on biofilm, aquarium décor or the sides of the tank, hunting detritus among the gravel, and sometimes even mating. Periodically, a shrimp will shed its exoskeleton, leaving an empty white ghost of itself caught in the plants or drifting around the tank. This should be left in the tank, as the shrimp will eat it to recover the valuable minerals it contains. There have been some reports by people of some shrimp attacking other vulnerable shrimp and/or fish, possible explanations have been insufficient protein in their diet or just general insufficiency of biofilm in the tank.

Pregnant N. davidi shrimp tend to hide in the dark. If they feel endangered by predators, they will abandon their eggs. They need an environment with wood or plants such as Java moss in which to hide themselves and their babies. When they are carrying the eggs under their bodies, they can be witnessed circulating water over the eggs with their pleopods (swimming legs) to ensure good health.

Diet 
N. davidi shrimp are primarily biofilm eaters. They will eat any aquarium food, but some prefer algae wafers or sinking shrimp pellets.   Cherry shrimp are omnivorous, which means they eat both plant and animal-based foods. They require a balanced diet to maintain optimal health and growth.  Blanched (boiled until soft) vegetables such as zucchini (courgette), baby carrots, peas, and kale can be used as a supplemental food. However, they should be fed sparingly, as uneaten food can quickly decompose and are recommended to be removed after a few hours to prevent potentially deadly ammonia spikes.  

To keep a clean substrate, some shrimp keepers put a glass bowl or glass plate on the bottom as a container for the food. If feeding commercial fish/shrimp food, one must ensure that there is no copper added (some breeders avoid only pure/elemental copper ) as this is dangerous for shrimp. Many breeders think copper sulfates, found in most fish food, are tolerated in low amounts.  Copper sulfates found in snail killer are in high amounts and will kill shrimp.

Some commercial water conditioners remove or neutralize copper, lead, and other metals from tap water in order to make it safe for aquarium life.

The best way to keep a healthy balance in a tank with shrimp is to let them eat the biofilm that grows in the tank- including on the glass, on plants, and all over driftwood; this way the tank works in balance along with the beneficial bacteria that grow in a filter. With at least a few hours of lighting to promote growth of biofilm, the shrimp will grow to maturity without any problems.

Sexing  
Neocaridina davidi have noticeable sexual dimorphism. The male is smaller and usually less colorful than the female. The male's tail, not being needed to carry eggs, is narrower. The female is larger and usually displays a richer, more opaque coloration, however selective breeding can produce males with similar quality of coloration. On the upper section of the female's body, on the "shoulder", the developing eggs on the ovaries may be seen in more transparent individuals. The color of these eggs will depend on the breed of individual shrimp. The shape of the ovaries drapes across both sides of the shrimp, giving rise to the nickname "saddle". The presence of a "saddle" indicates a female that is likely ready to mate.

Breeding 
N. davidi shrimp reach sexual maturity when they are around 4–6 months old. Breeding only requires a sexed pair of shrimp, stable water parameters, and a food source. Eggs may be observed developing in the female's ovaries as a green or yellow triangular "saddle" marking on her back. When she is ready to lay the eggs, which occurs after molting, she releases pheromones into the water to signal her availability to males. The male shrimp in the tank will often become agitated, swimming very actively about as they search for the source of the pheromones. After a brief mating process, during which the male deposits sperm onto the female's body, the female lays her eggs and affixes them to her swimmerettes. The eggs are not fertilized within the female; they are fertilized as they pass from the ovaries to the outside of the body. Therefore, it is certain that any shrimp carrying eggs has mated. A female carrying eggs under her abdomen is said to be "berried".

Some report that young female shrimp carrying their first clutch of eggs tend to drop some or all of the eggs, possibly due to inexperience or small size. If a berried shrimp is stressed by predators or poor water conditions she may also abandon the eggs.

They have 20–30 eggs, which take 2–3 weeks to hatch. The eggs are green or yellow, depending on the color of the saddle. They turn darker and darker until the young shrimp hatch after about three weeks. As the eggs near the end stages of growth, tiny dark eye spots of the developing shrimp within can be observed. When the young hatch, they are tiny (~1 mm) copies of the adults. They have no planktonic larval stage. They spend their first few days of life hiding among plants or stones, where they are almost invisible, nibbling on the biofilm on the plants. They then emerge and graze on algae on tank surfaces and ornaments.

Female shrimp, under ideal conditions, can breed again within a few days of hatching the previous clutch.

Tank mates 
In their natural environment, N. davidi shrimp are primary prey. When kept in an aquarium, they are easily targeted by fish as potential food. Even fish too small to eat them may harass them and stress them to death, sometimes biting off limbs. For best results, breeding should take place in isolation. Small, non-aggressive fish such as the ember tetras, harlequin rasbora, neon tetra, cardinal tetra, dwarf corydoras, otocinclus catfish, dwarf gouramis though these may predate if aggressive, platy (or peaceful livebearer relatives like the endler’s livebearer or guppy), and some species of killifish can be kept with adult N. davidi shrimp. However, baby shrimp are very likely to be eaten by any fish other than the otocinclus.  Most cichlids, including angel fish, will harass and readily eat adults as well. These dwarf shrimp will also be consumed by Australian rainbowfish and other large specimens of fish. With enough cover and hiding places (live plants such as Java moss work well), one can have a colony of N. davidi shrimp survive in a tank with larger fish preying on them. It is commonly suggested that one lets the shrimp reproduce a few generations/build up numbers before fish are added.

Availability 
The N. davidi shrimp has become widely available in North America, Europe, Asia, and Australia. These shrimp can be purchased from online fish stores, at aquarium stores, and from private breeders—especially through local aquarium societies. There are also many similar Neocaridina species of different color and markings that require the same conditions, these include fire reds, snowballs, blue pearls, rili shrimp, yellow shrimp, and wild types. Some species will hybridize, while variants within the same species will interbreed. Neocaridina shrimp can have similar colors due to different selective breeding processes. Cross-breeding different variations from different lineages (e.g. blues from the red line with blues from the blue line or brown line) is advised against as most young from such pairings revert to wild coloration. Cross-breeding differently colored shrimp from the same lineage (e.g. blue shrimp from the red line with red and clear shrimp from the red line) will not result in reversions to the wild coloration. Therefore, great care must be taken to establish the lineage of shrimp before crossing variants.

Varieties 
N. davidi kept in aquariums have a wide range of colors, mainly as a result of selective breeding, but wild Neocaridina davidi have slightly different colors, too. As most of these shrimps are half transparent, the color of Neocaridina davidi nearly always is a result of "blood" ("flesh", muscles etc.) coloration and "skin" (the chitin of the shell) coloration. 

Some colors may result from a specific mixture of the chromatophores; xanthophores (yellow/orange), erythrophores (red/orange), iridophores (blue), leucophores (white), and melanophores (black/brown). 

 Red - Red is the most frequently sold morph. The red color of the shrimp is caused by the presence of erythrophores.
 Yellow - The yellow color of the shrimp is caused by the presence of xanthophores.
 Blue - Blue shrimp are caused by the presence of iridophores which reflect blue light, or absence of melanophores combined with blue/blueish flesh.
 Green - Green shrimp is caused by the mixture of iridophores (that reflect blue light) and xanthophores.
 Violet - Violet shrimp is caused by the mixture of iridophores (that reflect blue light) and erythrophores.
 Chocolate - Melanophores that are a dark brown shade are present in this shrimp. Though erythrophores or xanthophores can contribute to the brown or chocolate color of the shrimp.
 Black - Black melanophores are present in this shrimp, or brown melanophores combined with blue/blueish flesh.
 White - White shrimp are mainly caused by the absence of melanophores.
 "Ghost" - "Ghost" shrimp don't have any pigment at all so they appear transparent.

References

Further reading

External links
 Red Cherry Shrimp - red-cherry-shrimp.com

Atyidae
Crustaceans described in 1904